Keith Anthony Bosley (16 September 1937 – 24 June 2018) was a British poet and translator.

Bosley was born in Bourne End, Buckinghamshire, and grew up in Maidenhead, Berkshire. He was educated at Sir William Borlase's Grammar School in Marlow (1949 – 1956) and the Universities of Paris, Caen, and Reading (1956 – 1960), where he read French.

In 1961 he began working for the BBC, mainly as an announcer and newsreader on the World Service, but the work for which he perhaps best known is as a poet and translator. In 1978 he was awarded the Finnish State Prize for Translators. In 1980 he became a Corresponding Member of the Finnish Literature Society, and a year later he undertook a Middle East lecture tour for the BBC and the British Council. Other accolades include first prizes in the British Comparative Literature Association's translation competition in 1982 and, in the same year, in the English Goethe Society's translation competition. In 1991 he was made a Knight, First Class, of the Order of the White Rose of Finland.

Bosley retired from the BBC in 1993 and lived in Berkshire. In 2001 he was awarded a pension from the Royal Literary Fund, and continued in his role as organist at St Laurence's Church, Upton-cum-Chalvey until 2015. He was married to harpist Satu Salo and had three sons – Ben (from an earlier marriage), Sebastian and Gabriel.

He died in a nursing home in Slough, Berkshire, after a short illness.

Publications 
Poetry
 The Possibility of Angels (1969)
 And I Dance: for children (1972)
 Dark Summer (1976)
 Stations (1979)
 A Chiltern Hundred (1987)
 An Upton Hymnal (1999)
 The Wedding-Guest: selected poems (ed. Owen Lowery and Anthony Rudolf) (2018)

Translations
 Russia's Other Poets (1968)
 An Idiom of Night: Pierre Jean Jouve (1968)
 The War Wife: Vietnamese poetry (1972)
 The Song of Songs (1976)
 Finnish Folk Poetry: Epic (1977)
 Mallarmé: The Poems (1977)
 A Round O: André Frénaud (1977)
 The Last Temptations: opera by Joonas Kokkonen (1977)
 Whitsongs: Eino Leino (1978)
 The Elek Book of Oriental Verse (1979)
 A Reading of Ashes: Jerzy Ficowski (1981)
 From the Theorems of Master Jean de La Ceppède (1983)
 The Kalevala (1989)
 Luís de Camões: Epic and Lyric (1990)
 The Kanteletar: selection (1992)
 The Great Bear: Finno-Ugrian oral poetry (1993)
 Odes: Aleksis Kivi (1994)
 A Centenary Pessoa (1995)
 Rome the Sorceress: André Frénaud (1995)
 Eve Blossom Has Wheels: German love poetry (1997)
 Skating on the Sea: poetry from Finland (1997)

Audiobooks
 The Kalevala (2013) – an audio recording of the 1989 translation

Bosley's other works include contributions to numerous journals in the UK, France, Finland and the US, and authorship of hundreds of radio scripts including The Poetry of Europe (nine 30-minute programmes, 1981) and The Kalevala (fifteen 15-minute programmes, 1992).

References

External links 
 Reviews of the Kalevala, as translated by Keith Bosley –  (published by Oxford University Press)
 A blog piece by Keith Bosley about his translation of the Kalevala
 The webpage for the Naxos audiobook recording of the Kalevala
 "The Kanteletar" thisisFINLAND.fi – Finland's treasury of folk lyrics and ballads
 Rome the Sorceress –  – by André Frénaud, as translated by Keith Bosley
 
 Web page for The Wedding-Guest (2018)

1937 births
2018 deaths
People from Wycombe District
People from Maidenhead
University of Paris alumni
University of Caen Normandy alumni
Alumni of the University of Reading
Radio and television announcers
English translators
English male poets
English male non-fiction writers
20th-century British translators
British expatriates in France